Robiquetia wassellii, commonly known as the green pouched orchid, is an epiphytic or lithophytic orchid from the family Orchidaceae. It has thick roots, a pendulous stem, between three and six crowded, dark green leaves and many crowded dark green flowers with pink to red centres and a white to yellowish labellum. It grows on trees and rocks in rainforest in tropical North Queensland, Australia.

Description
Robiquetia wassellii is an epiphytic or lithophytic herb that forms sparse clumps. Flowering occurs from June to August.

Taxonomy and naming
Robiquetia wassellii was first formally described in 1967 by Alick Dockrill who published the description in Australasian Sarcahthinae from a specimen collected in the McIlwraith Range by Joseph Leathom Hole Wassell. The specific epithet (wassellii) honours the collector of the type specimen.

Distribution and habitat
The green pouched orchid grows on trees and boulders in humid rainforest in the Iron and McIlwraith Ranges.

References

wassellii
Epiphytic orchids
Endemic orchids of Australia
Orchids of Queensland
Plants described in 1967